Richard John Wilson (born 23 October 1984 in Leicester, England) is a British-born Australian actor.

Biography

Early life
Richard Wilson moved from the UK to Sydney, Australia when he was six years old, and currently resides in Sydney. He and his younger brother, Andrew, were raised in the Blue Mountains by their parents. He attended the academically selective Penrith High School and Western Sydney University.

Acting career
Wilson is best known internationally for his role as Mike Burns, younger brother to Guy Pearce's Charlie Burns, in the 2005 epic Australian classic The Proposition.

Richard played the lead role in the 2006 Australian film 48 Shades, based on the book 48 Shades of Brown by Nick Earls.

He has won and been nominated for numerous awards, most notably for his critically acclaimed performance in the 2007 film Clubland for which he received an AFI Award Nomination for Best Supporting Actor. The Australian Broadcasting Corporation described Wilson's portrayal of a mentally handicapped teen as "a tour de force performance".

Academia

In 2009, Richard decided to take an extended break from performance to complete an honours degree at the Western Sydney University.

Awards 
2008
Film Critics Circle of Australia, Nominated, Best Actor – Supporting Role, Clubland (2007)

2007
Australian Film Institute Awards, Nominated, AFI Award, Best Supporting Actor, Clubland (2007)

2006
FILMINK Magazine Awards, Winner, Best Australian Newcomer, The Proposition (2005) and Deck Dogz (2005)

2006 St Kilda Film Festival, Winner, Best Actor, for Debut (2006 short film)

2005 Australian Film Institute Awards, Nominated, Young Actor's Award, Out There (2003) TV

Filmography 
Birthday (2011)
The Loved Ones (2010)
Liebermans in the Sky (2009)
Summer Breaks (2008)
Clubland (USA Title: Introducing the Dwights) (2007)
48 Shades (2006)
Debut (2006)
The Proposition (2005)
Deck Dogz (2005)
Out There (2003) (TV)
All Saints (2002) (TV)
McLeod's Daughters (2001 & 2002) (TV)
Flat Chat (2001) (TV)
Escape of the Artful Dodger (2001) (TV)

References

External links 

Australian people of English descent
English male film actors
Australian male film actors
Living people
1984 births